Lézignan is a village and commune in the Hautes-Pyrénées department in south-western France. Located around 11 miles (16 km) south of Tarbes,  in 2010 it had a population of 373, reducing to 355 at the 2019 Census.

See also
Communes of the Hautes-Pyrénées department

References

Communes of Hautes-Pyrénées